Spanish Blue is an album by bassist Ron Carter recorded at Van Gelder Studio in New Jersey in 1974 and released on the CTI label.

Reception
The Allmusic review by Ron Wynn awarded the album 2½ stars, calling it an "Interesting concept with good solos".

Track listing
All compositions by Ron Carter except where noted
 "El Noche Sol" - 5:56 
 "So What" (Miles Davis) - 11:24 
 "Sabado Sombrero" - 6:14 
 "Arkansas" - 10:33 
Recorded at Van Gelder Studio in Englewood Cliffs, New Jersey, on November 18, 1974

Personnel
Ron Carter - bass
Hubert Laws - flute 
Roland Hanna  - electric piano, piano (tracks 1-3)
Leon Pendarvis - electric piano (track 4) 
Jay Berliner (track 3) - guitar
Billy Cobham - drums, field drum 
Ralph MacDonald - percussion

References

1975 albums
CTI Records albums
Ron Carter albums
Albums produced by Creed Taylor
Albums recorded at Van Gelder Studio